Al Irata is a group that the United States Department of Defense identifies as a terrorist group.
One of the allegations prepared for Guantanamo captive Mohamed Atiq Awayd Al Harbi's Combatant Status Review Tribunal was:
"The detainee was a member of al Irata and a mujahadin fighter at Kandahar."

A team of legal scholars at Seton Hall University, led by Mark Denbeaux and Joshua Denbeaux, published a number of criticism of the United States Department of Defense's intelligence efforts.
The second critical analysis they published was entitled: "Inter- and Intra-Departmental Disagreements About Who Is Our Enemy".
The authors pointed out that the continued detention of dozens of Guantanamo captives was justified, at least in part, by an alleged association with dozens of organizations that weren't listed on any of the United States' official lists of terrorist organizations, like the "no-fly list".  The authors asked whether that meant visitors to the United States were being allowed entry, in spite of an association with organizations that posed real threats.  Alternatively, they asked, did this mean Guantanamo captives were being detained for association with organizations that did not represent real threats.

References

Organizations based in Asia designated as terrorist